The western chimpanzee, or West African chimpanzee, (Pan troglodytes verus) is a Critically Endangered subspecies of the common chimpanzee. It inhabits western Africa, specifically Côte d'Ivoire, Guinea, Liberia, Mali, Senegal, Ghana, Guinea-Bissau, but has been extirpated in three countries: Benin, Burkina Faso, and Togo.

Etymology
The taxonomical genus Pan is derived from the Greek god of fields, groves, and wooded glens, Pan. The species name troglodytes is Greek for 'cave-dweller', and was coined by Johann Friedrich Blumenbach in his Handbuch der Naturgeschichte (Handbook of Natural History) published in 1779. Verus is Latin for 'true', and was given to this subspecies in 1934 by Ernst Schwarz, who originally named it as Pan satyrus verus.

Taxonomy and genetics
The western chimpanzee (P. t. verus) is a subspecies of the common chimpanzee (Pan troglodytes), along with the central chimpanzee (P. t. troglodytes), the Nigeria-Cameroon chimpanzee (P. t. ellioti), and the eastern chimpanzee (P. t. schweinfurthii). The western chimpanzee last shared a common ancestor with P. t. ellioti between 0.4 and 0.6 million years ago (mya) and with P. t. troglodytes and P. t. schweinfurthii 0.38–0.55 mya.

Western chimpanzees are the most genetically differentiated and homozygous subspecies of the common chimpanzee.

Distribution and habitat
The population of the western chimpanzee once spanned from southern Senegal all the way east to the Niger River. Today, the largest populations remaining are found in Guinea, Sierra Leone, and Liberia.

Behavior

Diet and hunting
Male and female western chimpanzees differ in their prey. In Fongoli, Senegal, Senegal bushbabies account for 75% of females' prey and 47% of the males'. While males will prey more on monkeys, such as green monkeys (27%) and Guinea baboons (18%), only males were observed to hunt patas monkeys and only females were observed to hunt banded mongooses. Both will occasionally hunt bushbucks, preferring fawns, when given the chance. Adult, adolescent, and juvenile females are slightly more likely to hunt with tools than males of the same age group.

Unique behaviors
Western chimpanzees have unique behaviors never observed in any of the other subspecies of the chimpanzee. In fact, their behaviour is so diverged from that of their fellow subspecies of chimpanzee that it has been proposed West African chimpanzees may be a distinct species in their own right. Western chimpanzees engage in an unusual rock-throwing behaviour, throwing large rocks into hollow tree stumps or just against trees, presumably as some sort of primitive ritual or perhaps an early form of competitive sport. They make wooden spears to hunt other primates, use caves as homes, share plant foods with each other, and travel and forage during the night. They also submerge themselves in water and play in it to stay cool in the oppressive heat. 

Female west African chimpanzees are quite gregarious and often support one another in conflicts with males, resulting in a more gender-balanced hierarchy than that of the rigidly patriarchal east african chimpanzees. Female West African chimpanzees have been observed hunting and accompany males on territorial patrols, playing a more important role in social dynamics than other chimpanzee subspecies. While it was traditionally accepted that only female chimpanzees immigrate and males remain in their natal troop for life, Western Chimpanzees uniquely exhibit female and male immigration between groups, suggesting males are less territorial and more willing to accept unfamiliar males. Paternity tests indicate males frequently mate with females from several different communities, siring infants from them. There are even cases of solitary male western chimpanzees, while in any other population, a chimpanzee couldn't survive alone. Male West African chimpanzees generally are respectful of females and do not forcibly confiscate food from them, which may at least partly stem from the gregarious females forming alliances. Among the Tai forest community, infants are often adopted by unrelated adults, with both sexes adopting infants in equal measure. Female western chimpanzees also can rebuff the unwanted advances of males and select males to breed with on their own terms. This further is in line with the active and possibly co-dominant role female western chimpanzees play in their communities.

Conservation status
The IUCN lists the western chimpanzee as Critically Endangered on the Red List of Threatened Species. There are an estimated 21,300 to 55,600 individuals in the wild.  The primary threat to the western chimpanzee is habitat loss, although it is also killed for bushmeat.

References

western chimpanzee
Mammals of West Africa
Critically endangered fauna of Africa
western chimpanzee